Thamnolic acid is a β-orcinol depside with the molecular formula C19H16O11. Thamnolic acid was first isolated from the lichen Thamnolia vermicularis, but it also occur in Cladonia species.

References

Further reading 

 
 
 

Lichen products
Polyphenols
Carboxylic acids
Methoxy compounds